Kingston Estates is an unincorporated community and census-designated place (CDP) located within Cherry Hill, in Camden County, New Jersey, United States, that had been part of the Barclay-Kingston CDP until the 2000 Census, which was split to form the CDPs of Barclay and Kingston Estates as of the 2010 Census. As of the 2010 United States Census, the CDP's population was 5,685.

Geography
According to the United States Census Bureau, the CDP had a total area of 1.164 square miles (3.013 km2), including 1.162 square miles (3.009 km2) of land and 0.002 square miles (0.004 km2) of water (0.13%).

Demographics

Census 2010

References

Census-designated places in Camden County, New Jersey
Neighborhoods in Cherry Hill, New Jersey